Heartbeat is a 2004 children's book by Sharon Creech, published by HarperCollins in the US and Bloomsbury in the UK.  It is aimed at children aged 10 and above.

Like Love That Dog, the book is written in free verse, which alters according to both the subject and the main character's mood.

Summary 
Twelve-year-old Annie is having a very significant year. Her mother is pregnant, her grandfather is forgetful, her best friend is always moody, and she has a new art assignment-draw an apple each day for one hundred days. She is friends with Max, a mysterious boy that wants to "escape"

Reception and awards
Adèle Geras of The Guardian gave the novel a positive review, praising its ability to get straight to the point, and commented that although "verse novels are risky", Creech's verse "will encourage young readers to put their own emotions into words precisely because the form is so much less daunting than thickets of dense prose."

Heartbeat was nominated for the 2005 Carnegie Medal.

Editions
 , hardback, 2004
 , paperback, 2005

References

2004 American novels
American children's novels

Novels by Sharon Creech
Verse novels
2004 children's books